Klayton Aaron Stainer (born 28 August 1991) is an Australian Filmmaker. He attended the Swinburne University of Technology in Melbourne. His film company is called KAS Creations Film & Media.

Awards and nominations

I Remember the Future
 2015 Byron Bay International Film Festival for Young Australian Filmmaker of the Year - nominated
 2014 WorldFest Houston - Won the Grand Remi Award for Best Student Film
 2014 California Film Awards - Won the Grand Award for Best Foreign Short
 2014 Oregon International Film Awards - Won the Platinum Award for Best Short Film
 2014 SciFi Film Festival - Won Best Script
 2014 ATOM Awards for Best Short Fiction Film - nominated
 2014 ATOM Awards for Best Tertiary Short Fiction - nominated
 2014 Accolade Competition - Won Award of Merit for Best Short Film

3 Minutes
 2013 WorldFest Houston - Won the Silver Award for Best Science Fiction Film
 2013 Melbourne Underground Film Festival for Best Short Film - nominated
 2013 Los Angeles Movie Awards - Honorable Mention

Atom
 2012 Melbourne International Animation Festival - Won Best of the Next - Australian Award
 2012 WorldFest Houston - Won the Platinum Award for Best Science Fiction Film
 2012 California Film Awards - Won the Gold Award for Best Animated Film
 2012 Oregon International Film Awards - Won the Grand Remi Award for Best Student Film
 2012 Maverick Movie Awards for Best Picture - nominated
 2012 Maverick Movie Awards for Best Director - nominated
 2012 Maverick Movie Awards for Best Animation - nominated

Filmography
 I Remember the Future (2014)
 3 Minutes (2013) (Short)
 Atom (2012) (Animation)
 Collectables (2012) (Short)
 Watching the Wheels (2011) (Documentary)
 The Boys Are Back (2009) (Actor)
 Broken Hill (2009) (Actor)
 Hey Hey It's Esther Blueburger (2008) (Actor)
 Alma Mater High (2007) (Actor)
 Dr. Plonk'' (2007) (Actor)

References
 Awards for Klayton Stainer IMDb, (Retrieved 12 September 2015)

External links

Australian filmmakers
Living people
1991 births